Aeromicrobium massiliense is a Gram-positive, aerobic, rod-shaped and motile bacterium from the genus Aeromicrobium which has been isolated from human feces in Senegal.

References 

Propionibacteriales
Bacteria described in 2014